Natalie M. Fryde is an historian of medieval England. Her areas of scholarship include Angevin England, King Edward II, and Magna Carta.

Her writing on Magna Carta has been described as "a new look". Her writing about the last portion of Edward II's reign was described as combining "a reappraisal of financial policy with an examination of the activities of the Despensers, neither of whom has yet found a biographer".

Selected publications

References

British medievalists
Women medievalists
20th-century British historians
British women historians
20th-century British women writers